Veljko Tukša (known in the United States as Val Tuksa; born 21 November 1950) is a retired Yugoslavian association football player who played professionally in the North American Soccer League and Major Indoor Soccer League.  He was the 1982 MISL Defender of the Year.

Career
In 1979, Tuksa played for Toronto Metros-Croatia of the North American Soccer League.  In 1980 and 1981, he played for the Rochester Lancers in the NASL.  In 1978, he signed with the New York Arrows of the Major Indoor Soccer League where he would play every winter indoor season until 1984.  He was the 1982 MISL Defender of the Year.  In 1984, he moved to the Las Vegas Americans.  When the Americans folded at the end of the season, the head coach Don Popovic moved to the Pittsburgh Spirit where he signed Tuksa.  The Spirit folded at the end of the 1985-1986 season.  In November 1986, the Tacoma Stars signed Tuksa.  On 5 December 1987, the Stars released Tuksa.  The team signed him at a reduced salary in January 1988, but he saw time in only eighteen games before being released.

Yearly awards
 MISL Defender of the Year 1981-82
 MISL All-Star Team 1981-82, 1982–83

References

External links
 
 NASL/MILS stats

1950 births
Living people
Footballers from Zagreb
Association football defenders
Association football midfielders
Yugoslav footballers
NK Zagreb players
GNK Dinamo Zagreb players
Toronto Blizzard (1971–1984) players
New York Arrows players
NK Olimpija Ljubljana (1945–2005) players
Rochester Lancers (1967–1980) players
Las Vegas Americans players
Pittsburgh Spirit players
Tacoma Stars players
Yugoslav First League players
Major Indoor Soccer League (1978–1992) players
North American Soccer League (1968–1984) players
Yugoslav expatriate footballers
Expatriate soccer players in Canada
Yugoslav expatriate sportspeople in Canada
Expatriate soccer players in the United States
Yugoslav expatriate sportspeople in the United States